Jean-Félix Acquaviva (born 19 March 1973) is a French politician representing Pè a Corsica. He was elected to the French National Assembly on 18 June 2017, representing Haute-Corse's 2nd constituency.

He was re-elected in the 2022 election under the Femu a Corsica banner.

See also
 2017 French legislative election
 Haute-Corse's 2nd constituency

References

Living people
Deputies of the 15th National Assembly of the French Fifth Republic
Members of the Corsican Assembly
Femu a Corsica politicians
Place of birth missing (living people)
Deputies of the 16th National Assembly of the French Fifth Republic
1973 births